Cnemaspis nicobaricus is a species of diurnal, rock-dwelling, insectivorous gecko endemic to  India. It is distributed in Great Nicobar Island.

References

 Cnemaspis nicobaricus

nicobaricus
Reptiles of India
Reptiles described in 2020